Olavius vacuus is a species of oligochaete worm, first found in Belize, on the Caribbean side of Central America.

References

Further reading
Diaz, Robert J., and Christer Erseus. "Habitat preferences and species associations of shallow-water marine Tubificidae (Oligochaeta) from the barrier reef ecosystems off Belize, Central America." Aquatic Oligochaete Biology V. Springer Netherlands, 1994. 93-105.
Rousset, Vincent, et al. "Evolution of habitat preference in Clitellata (Annelida)." Biological Journal of the Linnean Society 95.3 (2008): 447-464.
Gustavsson, Lena M., and Christer Erséus. "Cuticular ultrastructure in some marine oligochaetes (Tubificidae)." Invertebrate Biology 119.2 (2000): 152-166.

External links
WORMS

Tubificina
Taxa named by Christer Erséus